A Silent Witness is a 1912 Australian silent film directed by Franklyn Barrett. It is considered a lost film. It was a drama set in Sydney with Cyril Mackay as the hero.

Barrett later claimed this detective drama was the first production in which he had a "free hand".

Cast
Cyril Mackay
Irby Marshall
Charles Lawrence
Sydney Stirling
Leonard Willey
George Bryant
Loris Brown

References

External links

1912 films
Australian drama films
Australian silent short films
Australian black-and-white films
1912 drama films
Lost Australian films
1912 lost films
Lost drama films
Films directed by Franklyn Barrett
Silent drama films